Charles Oliver Carroll (August 13, 1906 – June 23, 2003) was an American football player and attorney from Washington.

Carroll played for Garfield High School and earned 17 varsity letters while there. He would be given the title of Garfield Athlete of the First Half of the Century in 1950. He attended the University of Washington, where during his junior year, in a game against the school's rival, Washington State University, he was part of two-thirds of the tackles while also rushing for 136 yards. After scoring 15 touchdowns that year, a school record, he was named to the first-team All-Coast and second-team All-American.

During Carroll's senior year, he had six touchdowns against the College of Puget Sound (now University of Puget Sound), scoring 36 of the team's 40 points, a UW record for points in a game by a single player. He played for all but six minutes of the 1928 season's six conference games. Stanford's coach, Pop Warner, said he had never seen "a greater football player." Carroll would go on to earn a place in the College Football Hall of Fame, the National Football Foundation Hall of Fame, and was the first inductee to the University of Washington Husky Football Hall of Fame. His jersey, No. 2, is one of only three numbers retired by the University of Washington football program.
Former UW wide receiver Kasen Williams was allowed to wear No. 2 in honor of his father, Husky great Aaron Williams, who wore the same number before the university retired it.

After his football career he went into law, going back to the UW for law school. He was a judge advocate in the military during World War II. Carroll later served as King County Prosecuting Attorney from 1949 to 1971.

See also
 Washington Huskies football statistical leaders

References

External links
 

1906 births
2003 deaths
American football halfbacks
Washington Huskies football players
All-American college football players
Players of American football from Seattle